Hanan El Tawil (also spelled Hannan Eltaweil and Hanan El Taweil; , February 12, 1966 in Sinnuris, Faiyum – December 1, 2004 in Cairo) was an Egyptian actress and singer who played roles in cinema, comedy, and theater. She was the first transgender actress in Egypt. Her death in 2004 is speculated to be a suicide due to mental illness exacerbated by frequent harassment. She was the subject of a documentary by Egyptian LGBTQ advocacy group No Hate Egypt.

Notable roles 

 Al-Nazer (The Principal, 2000) - English teacher Miss Inshirah
 55 Esaaf (2001) - Neighbor Aziza
 Askar fi el-mu'askar (2003) - El Set Korea

References

External links 

Hannan Eltaweil on IMDb
في ذكرى ميلاد  حنان الطويل Hanan El Tawil's Birthday (No Hate Egypt Facebook page)

1966 births
2004 deaths
Egyptian women
Egyptian actresses
Transgender actresses
Egyptian LGBT actors
People from Faiyum Governorate
20th-century LGBT people